List of Battalions of the York and Lancaster Regiment :

List of Battalions

Regulars
1st Battalion (Regular) - World War I - 83rd Brigade, 28th Division. World War II - 15th Brigade, 5th Infantry Division
2nd Battalion (Regular) - World War I - 16th Brigade, 6th Division. World War II - 14th Brigade, 6th Infantry Division (later 70th Infantry Division)

Militia
3rd (Militia) Battalion (3rd West York Regiment of Militia)

Territorials and Volunteers
1st (Hallamshire) Volunteer Battalion (1881–1908)
2nd Volunteer Battalion (1881–1908)
4th (Hallamshire) Battalion (1908–1924) formerly 1st (Hallamshire) Volunteer Battalion
5th Battalion (1908–1936) formerly 2nd Volunteer Battalion
The Hallamshire Battalion (1924–1967)
Yorkshire Volunteers (1967–1993)
The Hallamshire (T) Battalion (1967–1971)
1/4th (Hallamshire) Battalion - 148th (3rd West Riding) Brigade, 49th (West Riding) Infantry Division
1/5th Battalion - 148th (3rd West Riding) Brigade, 49th (West Riding) Infantry Division

Hostilities only units
2/4th (Hallamshire) Battalion (191419)2nd Line Territorial Army (TA)187th Brigade, 62nd (2nd West Riding) Division
3/4th (Hallamshire) Battalion (191519)3rd Line TAHome Service
2/5th Battalion (191418)2nd Line TA187th Brigade, 62nd (2nd West Riding) Division
3/5th Battalion (191516)3rd Line TAHome Service
5th Battalion (193945)1st Line TAconverted to 67th Heavy Anti-Aircraft Regiment, Royal Artillery
6th (Service) Battalion (191419)32nd Brigade, 11th (Northern) Division
6th Battalion (193947)2nd Line TA138th Infantry Brigade, 46th Division
7th (Service) Battalion (Pioneers) (191419)50th Brigade, 17th (Northern) Division
7th Battalion (Pioneers) (194046)served in India throughout the war
8th (Service) Battalion (191419)70th Infantry Brigade, 23rd Division
8th Battalion (Pioneers) (194045)Indian 25th Division
9th (Service) Battalion (191419)70th Brigade, 23rd Division
9th Battalion (194046)Indian 25th Division
10th (Service) Battalion (191418)63rd Infantry Brigade, 21st Division (attached to 37th Division from 1916)
10th Battalion (194041)converted to 150th Regiment, Royal Armoured Corps, 254th Indian Tank Brigade
11th Reserve Battalion (191416)90th Brigade, 33rd DivisionHome Service, disbanded 1916
11th Battalion (194044)
12th (Sheffield) (Service) Battalion (191418) The Sheffield City Battalion94th Brigade, 31st Division
13th (1st Barnsley) (Service) Battalion (191415) The Barnsley Pals94th Brigade, 31st Division (attached 93rd Brigade from Feb. 1918)
14th (2nd Barnsley) (Service) Battalion (191418) The Barnsley Pals94th Brigade, 31st Division
15th Reserve Battalion (19151916)Home Service
16th (Transport Workers) Battalion (191619)Home Service
17th Labour Battalion (191617)Home Service
18th Battalion (1918)41st Brigade, 14th (Light) Division (from June 1918)
50th (Holding) Battalion (1940)
53rd (Service) Battalion (1919)

York and Lancaster Regiment, List of battalions 
Bri
York and Lancaster Regiment
York and Lancaster Regiment
York and Lancaster Regiments battalions